Octagon is the eighth studio album by Swedish extreme metal band Bathory. It was released on 17 October 1995 through Black Mark Production. It continues the retro thrash metal style of the previous album, Requiem. It was reissued in 2003, with the first two tracks combined and "Winds of Mayhem" outro added.

Track listing

2003 reissue

Personnel 
 Quorthon – vocals, guitar
 Kothaar – bass guitar
 Vvornth – percussion, drums

References 

Bathory (band) albums
1995 albums
Thrash metal albums by Swedish artists